The Bob Cook Memorial Mount Evans Hill Climb or Mount Evans Hill Climb is a bicycle race situated on Mount Evans near Idaho Springs, Colorado.  Begun in 1962, the race has been held every year since except for three cancellations. In 1981, it was renamed in honor of five-time race winner Bob Cook, who died of cancer at the age of 23. The race is 27.4 miles (44.1 kilometers) in length and ascends .

The race takes place on the highest paved road in the United States, starting at an altitude of 7,540 feet (2,298 meters) and terminating at 14,130 feet (4,306 meters), 130 feet (39 meters) below Mount Evans' summit. Due to the altitude, the event is sometimes marked by inclement weather.

Over the years, the race has attracted significant professional riders.  Riders come from all over the United States and in the past the race has had riders from France, Switzerland, Germany, and Australia compete. The age range of the participants is from nine to eighty-five years. The race is also supported by volunteers from the Colorado cycling community who help marshal, drive support, officiate and work the picnic. The event includes categories for all levels of racing and encourages riders of all abilities.  Between six hundred and a thousand riders compete each year in a number of categories.

Course records
Bob Cook held the course record from 1975-1980.  The first three years he held the record he was a junior. The present men's record is held by Tom Danielson, set in 2004 with a time of 1:41:20. The women's course record is held by Jeannie Longo of France at 1:59:19.

Canceled years
The race was canceled three times: twice due to snow and once when the race director was in Atlanta at the 1996 Summer Olympics.

List of winners
Women competed in the race beginning in 1976.
The winners of the race are:

Race notes

References

Cycle races in the United States
Women's road bicycle races
Recurring sporting events established in 1962
1962 establishments in Colorado
Road bicycle races